A technological revolution is a period in which one or more technologies is replaced by another novel technology in a short amount of time. It is an era of accelerated technological progress characterized by new innovations whose rapid application and diffusion typically cause an abrupt change in society.

Description

A technological revolution generally increases productivity and efficiency. It may involve material or ideological changes caused by the introduction of a device or system. Some examples of its potential impact are business management, education, social interactions, finance and research methodology; it is not limited strictly to technical aspects. A technological revolution significantly changes the material conditions of human existence and can reshape culture. It can play a role as a trigger of a chain of various and unpredictable changes.

What distinguishes a technological revolution from a random collection of technology systems and justifies conceptualizing it as a revolution are two basic features:

1. The strong interconnectedness and interdependence of the participating systems in their technologies and markets.

2. The capacity to transform profoundly the rest of the economy (and eventually society).

The consequences of a technological revolution are not necessarily positive. For example, innovations, such as the use of coal as an energy source, can have negative environmental impact and cause technological unemployment. Joseph Schumpeter described this contradictory nature of technological revolution, creative destruction. The concept of technological revolution is based on the idea that technological progress is not linear but undulatory. Technological revolution can be
 Relation revolution (social relations, phones)
 Sectoral (more technological changes in one sector, e.g. Green Revolution and Commercial Revolution)
 Universal (interconnected radical changes in more sectors, the universal technological revolution can be seen as a complex of several parallel sectoral technological revolutions, e.g. Second Industrial Revolution and Renaissance technological revolution)

The concept of universal technological revolutions is a key factor in the Neo-Schumpeterian theory of long economic waves/cycles (Carlota Perez, Tessaleno Devezas, Daniel Šmihula and others).

History
The most well-known examples of a technological revolutions were the Industrial Revolution in the 19th century, the scientific-technical revolution about 1950–1960, the Neolithic Revolution, and the Digital Revolution. It is not easy to define which technological revolutions have been crucial and influenced not only one segment of human activity, but had a universal impact. One universal technological revolution may be composed of several sectoral technological revolutions (in science, industry, transport and the like).

There are several universal technological revolutions which occurred during the modern era in Western culture:
 Financial-agricultural revolution (1600–1740)
 Industrial Revolution (1780–1840)
 Technical revolution or Second Industrial Revolution (1870–1920)
 Scientific-technical revolution (1940–1970) 
 Information and telecommunications revolution, also known as the Digital Revolution or Third Industrial Revolution (1975–2021)

Attempts to find comparable periods of well defined technological revolutions in the pre-modern era are highly speculative. Probably one of the most systematic attempts to suggest a timeline of technological revolutions in pre-modern Europe was done by Daniel Šmihula:
 Indo-European technological revolution (1900–1100 BC) 
 Celtic and Greek technological revolution (700–200 BC)
 Germano-Slavic technological revolution (300–700 AD)
 Medieval technological revolution (930–1200 AD)
 Renaissance technological revolution (1340–1470 AD)

Structure of technological revolution 
Each revolution comprises the following engines for growth:

 New cheap inputs
 New products
 New processes

Every revolution utilizes something that is cheap. For instance, the Industrial Revolution had cheap coal for iron steam engines which led to production of Iron railways. The same applied in the technological revolution where there was cheap microelectronics for computers which thus progressed the internet. A combination of low-cost input and new infrastructures are at the core of each revolution to achieve their all pervasive impact.

Potential future technological revolutions

After 2000, a popular idea arose, that a sequence of technological revolutions is not over and in the forthcoming future the world will witness the dawn of a new universal technological revolution.

The Second Machine Age is the term adopted in a 2014 book by Erik Brynjolfsson and Andrew McAfee. The industrial development plan of Germany began promoting the term Industry 4.0. In 2019, at the World Economic Forum meeting in Davos, Japan promoted another round of advancements called Society 5.0.

The phrase Fourth Industrial Revolution was first introduced by Klaus Schwab, the executive chairman of the World Economic Forum, in a 2015 article in Foreign Affairs, "Mastering the Fourth Industrial Revolution" was the theme of the World Economic Forum Annual Meeting 2016 in Davos-Klosters, Switzerland. On October 10, 2016, the Forum announced the opening of its Centre for the Fourth Industrial Revolution in San Francisco. This was also subject and title of Schwab's 2016 book. Schwab includes in this fourth era technologies that combine hardware, software, and biology (cyber-physical systems), and emphasizes advances in communication and connectivity. Schwab expects this era to be marked by breakthroughs in emerging technologies in fields such as robotics, artificial intelligence, nanotechnology, quantum computing, biotechnology, the internet of things, the industrial internet of things (IIoT), decentralized consensus, fifth-generation wireless technologies (5G), 3D printing and fully autonomous vehicles.

Jeremy Rifkin includes technologies like 5G, autonomous vehicles, Internet of Things, and renewable energy in the Third Industrial Revolution.

An emerging group of economists do not think that technological growth will continue to the same degree it has in the past. Robert J. Gordon holds the view that today’s inventions are simply not as radical as electricity and the internal combustion engine were. He believes that modern technology is not as innovative as others claim, and is far from creating a revolution.

List of intellectual, philosophical and technological revolutions (sectoral or universal)

Pre-Industrialization
 The Upper Paleolithic Revolution: the emergence of "high culture", new technologies and regionally distinct cultures (50,000–40,000 years ago).
 The Neolithic Revolution (perhaps 13,000 years ago), which formed the basis for human civilization to develop.
 The Renaissance technological revolution: the set of inventions during the Renaissance period, roughly the 14th through the 16th century.
 The Commercial Revolution: a period of European economic expansion, colonialism and mercantilism which lasted from approximately the 16th century until the early 18th century.
 The Price Revolution: a series of economic events from the second half of the 15th century to the first half of the 17th, the price revolution refers most specifically to the high rate of inflation that characterized the period across Western Europe.
 The Scientific Revolution: a fundamental transformation in scientific ideas around the 16th century.
 The British Agricultural Revolution (18th century), which spurred urbanization and consequently helped launch the Industrial Revolution.

Industrialization
 The First Industrial Revolution: the major shift of technological, socioeconomic and cultural conditions in the late 18th century and early 19th century that began in Britain and spread throughout the world.
 The Market Revolution: a drastic change in the manual labour system originating in the Southern United States (and soon moving to the Northern United States) and later spreading to the entire world (about 1800–1900).
 The Second Industrial Revolution (1871–1914).
 The Green Revolution (1945–1975): the use of industrial fertilizers and new crops greatly increased the world's agricultural output.
 The Third Industrial Revolution: the sweeping changes brought about by computing and communication technology, starting from circa 1950 with the creation of the first general-purpose electronic computers.
 The Information Revolution: the massive economic, social and technological changes resulting from the Digital Revolution (after 1960?).

See also

 Accelerating change
 Automation
 Electrification
 Kondratiev wave
 Kranzberg's laws of technology
 List of emerging technologies
 Mass production
 Machine tool
 Mechanization
 Post-work society
 Productivity-improving technologies
 Innovation
 Technological change
 Technological unemployment
 The War on Normal People
 The Future of Work and Death

References

Revolution
Revolution
Revolution
Stages of history
Revolution